Foo Fighters is the debut studio album by American rock band Foo Fighters, released on July 4, 1995, through Roswell and Capitol Records. Dave Grohl wrote and recorded the entire album himself, with the assistance of producer Barrett Jones at Robert Lang Studios in Seattle, Washington, in 1994. He said that he recorded the album just for fun, describing it as a cathartic experience to recover from the suicide of Nirvana bandmate Kurt Cobain.

After Grohl completed the recordings, he chose the name "Foo Fighters" for the project to hide his identity, and passed cassette copies of the sessions to personal friends. When the tapes attracted record label interest, Grohl signed with Capitol and recruited a full band to perform the songs live. The album was promoted through extensive tours and six singles, two of which were accompanied by music videos.

Upon its release, Foo Fighters earned positive reviews, praising its songwriting and performances, and was also a commercial success, becoming the band's second-best-selling album in the United States. It also peaked within the top five of charts of the United Kingdom, Canada, Australia, and New Zealand.

Background

In 1990, Dave Grohl joined the grunge band Nirvana as drummer. During tours, he took a guitar with him and wrote songs, but was too intimidated to share them with the band; he was "in awe" of the songs written by frontman Kurt Cobain. Grohl occasionally booked studio time to record demos and covers, issuing an album of demos, Pocketwatch, under the pseudonym Late! in 1992.

Following Cobain's suicide in April 1994, Grohl entered a state of depression, and found it difficult to both listen to music and play instruments. He was uncertain of what to do next, even considering abandoning his musical career despite a few invitations by bands such as Danzig or Tom Petty and the Heartbreakers to become their drummer, because "it would just remind me of being in Nirvana; every time I sat down at a drum set, I would think of that."

Grohl's first musical performance following the demise of Nirvana was performing with The Backbeat Band at the 1994 MTV Movie Awards in June, during which he was invited by Mike Watt to take part in his album Ball-Hog or Tugboat?. After enjoying the performance, Grohl figured he could do his own musical project, which could work as "some sort of cathartic therapy, to go out and record these songs that I'd written by myself." Grohl afterwards booked six days at Seattle's Robert Lang Studios, which were located near his house, where he would record "my favorite songs I had written in the past four, five years that no one had heard" with the assistance of Pocketwatch producer Barrett Jones. The idea was to have Grohl playing all instruments and release it under a name that would make people believe it was a band, similar to Stewart Copeland's Klark Kent.

Recording

Grohl and Jones produced the record across a period of one week in October 1994, with Grohl on vocals and all instruments. Both would arrive in the morning at Robert Lang Studios, start production by noon and do four songs a day. According to Grohl, during the recording process he would run from room to room, "still sweating and shaking from playing drums and [then] pick up the guitar and put down a track, do the bass, maybe another guitar part, have a sip of coffee and then go in and do the next song". The only performance by an outsider was a guitar part on "X-Static" provided by Greg Dulli of the Afghan Whigs, who was watching Grohl record the songs. Grohl eventually asked him if he wanted to play and handed him a guitar. Each song took about 45 minutes to be completed, and the compositions were recorded in the same order that became the album's track listing. The only song that required two run-throughs before completion was "I'll Stick Around". Grohl was insecure about his singing, and added effects to his voice in "Floaty", and tried to enhance the performance through double track – "You know how people double their vocals to make them stronger? That album the vocals are quadrupled."

In an attempt to keep his anonymity, Grohl planned to release the songs under the name Foo Fighters, a name he took from an ufology book he was reading at the time, Above Top Secret, that in a chapter described the "foo fighter" phenomena. It would be a very low-key release, with only 100 LP records being pressed after the sessions were finished. Grohl also went to a cassette duplication lab in Seattle and created 100 cassette copies of the session and started handing them to friends for feedback and "I'd give tapes to everybody. Kids would come up to me and say 'Nirvana was my favourite band' and I'd say 'well here, have this'". Eddie Vedder premiered two songs from the recording on January 8, 1995, during his Self-Pollution radio broadcast. The recordings quickly circulated amongst the music industry, which in turn created record label interest. A deal was eventually signed to Capitol Records, as president Gary Gersh was a personal friend of Grohl ever since he worked on Nirvana's label Geffen Records.

The mixing sessions of the album began in Robert Lang Studios (which were used on the 100 tapes Grohl gave away) but eventually those mixes were discarded and the sessions moved to Rob Schnapf and Tom Rothrock's "The Shop" studio in Arcata, California. Mixes were done on a 32 channel API DeMedio console, custom built by Frank DeMedio in 1972 for Wally Heider Recording's 'Studio 4'. A Stephen's 24 track 2" tape machine was used for playback. Processors used in the mixes included an Eventide Omnipressor compressor for vocals and guitar solos, an Alan Smart stereo compressor for "squashing" the drums and mixing them back in as well as being used over the entire mix. Other processors included UREI 1176 and LA3A compressors as well as an Echoplex for delays and a "crappy digital reverb". Mixes were "nothing that crazy" Rob described, adding that he "mixed 'Big Me' in 20 minutes".

During the sessions, Grohl was invited by Tom Petty to perform with The Heartbreakers on Saturday Night Live one month later. The performance was followed by an invitation to be a full-time member of the Heartbreakers, but once Petty heard about the Foo Fighters, he instead encouraged Grohl to move on with this solo project. Grohl soon recruited a full band, which included bassist Nate Mendel and drummer William Goldsmith of the recently disbanded Sunny Day Real Estate, as well as Nirvana touring guitarist, and former Germs member, Pat Smear.

Music and composition

Nine of the songs in the album were composed before or during Grohl's tenure with Nirvana, and existed in demos created by Grohl on his home 8-track tape recorder. The only compositions done after Cobain's death were "This Is a Call", "I'll Stick Around", "X-Static" and "Wattershed". The album's sound has been primarily described as punk rock, grunge, alternative rock, and post-grunge. Stephen Thomas Erlewine of AllMusic stated that the album was a "handful of punk-pop gems that show, given the right musicians and songwriters, the genre had not entirely become a cliché by the middle of the '90s." The music mostly followed a hard rock sound with the soft-loud dynamics seen in Nirvana tracks such as "Smells Like Teen Spirit" and "Heart-Shaped Box". Variants include the melancholic "Exhausted", which Grohl defined as a song that's "sad but makes you feel good".

Most of the lyrics on Foo Fighters are nonsensical lines written by Grohl in the 20 minutes before recording began. As Grohl later explained, "I had seven days to record fifteen songs. I was just concentrating on everything being as together as possible, having everything be tight and in sync. There wasn't too much time spent sitting in a chair thinking." Grohl would add that the gibberish was deliberate, given that "there was too much to say" following Cobain's death and "a lot of emphasis [was] placed on the meaning of the first Foo Fighters album." Grohl still considered that "the things you write down spur of the moment are most revealing. Now I look at them and some of them seem to actually have meaning", and revealed that a few songs have lyrics inspired by "personal experiences of the last four or five years", with the standout being "Big Me", an "out-and-out love song" to Grohl's then-wife Jennifer Youngblood that he described as his favorite track on the album. Contrasting with the aggressive and rebellious themes of Nirvana, Grohl had positive and cheery tunes such as "This Is a Call", defined as "a 'hello' and a 'thank you'" to everyone that had played a key role in Grohl's life; the playful "For All the Cows"; and "Wattershed", with a title referencing Mike Watt and lyrics that described Grohl's "love of hardcore and old school punk rock".

Packaging

The name "Foo Fighters" was taken from the description World War II aircraft pilots would use to describe various UFOs. This science fiction theme is further continued with the name of Grohl's Capitol Records imprint, Roswell Records, a reference to the city of Roswell, New Mexico, known for the Roswell UFO incident of 1947; and the album cover done by Grohl's then-wife, photographer Jennifer Youngblood, featuring a Buck Rogers XZ-38 Disintegrator Pistol. Some reviewers considered the gun on the cover as insensitive, given Kurt Cobain died by shooting himself, but Grohl dutifully disregarded it as just a coincidence.  Goldsmith later explained, "It was all pretty much based on the whole Foo Fighters thing—Roswell, the space stuff, an antique Buck Rogers raygun. It's really a completely separate thing. Dave wasn't even conscious of that." Despite Grohl being the album's only contributor, at Capitol's insistence the liner notes included a picture of the full band that Grohl had recruited.

Release and promotion
In spring 1995, Foo Fighters embarked on their first ever United States tour, supporting Mike Watt on his Ring Spiel Tour along with fellow tour newbies Hovercraft, whose line-up included Vedder at the time. As well as performing with their own bands, Grohl and Vedder each picked up a role as a member of Watt's backing band throughout the tour, supplying drums and guitar respectively. In May 1995, radio stations KROQ-FM and KNDD started playing some tracks of the then-unreleased album before receiving a cease-and-desist from Capitol. That June, "Exhausted" and "This Is a Call" were sent to college and modern rock radio stations. One week later, "This Is a Call" became the band's first commercial single.

Foo Fighters was released July 4, 1995, on Roswell Records, distributed by Capitol Records. The band promoted the release that summer by completing another US tour with Wool and Shudder to Think, with 25 concerts in little over a month. Foo Fighters also made their network television debut on the Late Show with David Letterman on August 14, performing "This Is a Call". Afterwards, the band played several of their largest shows up to that point, making their debut on the European festival circuit with performances at Pukkelpop, Reading and Lowlands.

"I'll Stick Around" was issued as the second single on September 4, 1995, and would also mark Foo Fighters' music video debut, directed by Gerald Casale. That fall, the band continued to tour extensively, with a European tour with Built to Spill, and visits to Japan, Australia and New Zealand. The tour was wrapped with a performance at the Phoenix Festival on July 20, 1996. The Foo Fighters performed nearly 100 concerts throughout 1995, and over 70 dates the following year.

Three more songs of the album were issued as singles: "For All the Cows" in 1995, and both "Big Me" and "Alone + Easy Target" in 1996. "Big Me" was the first commercial single made available in the US, and the second song from the album to see release as a music video, a parody of the Mentos television commercials directed by Jesse Peretz.

Critical reception

Foo Fighters earned mostly positive reviews upon release. Many critics compared the album to Nirvana. Reviewer David Browne of Entertainment Weekly considered that "[Grohl's] songs pack the riffy wallop of unpolished Nirvana demos, and his voice has Kurt Cobain's lunging, over-the-top passion." Writing for Spin, Terri Sutton stylistically compared the album to Nirvana's second album, Nevermind, saying that "the album's first half [...] owes much to Nevermind, and it's tempting to hear it in the way Nevermind taught us to hear." Paul Rees of Kerrang! admitted that "Foo Fighters cannot fail to evoke Kurt Cobain's memory, whether if through Grohl's ragged howl of a voice or the way a number of its songs go soft-soft-loud", but ultimately considered the record "more than strong enough to stand or fall in its own merits".  Billboard complimented the "inspired songwriting and passionate performances", adding the album could please grunge fans and "also remind fans of other rock and punk taste makers, from Green Day and the Offspring to Better than Ezra."

The album received minor criticism for its lack of intensity, which many proposed was due to the fact that Grohl played all the instruments himself. AllMusic reviewer Stephen Thomas Erlewine wrote, "Since he recorded the album by himself, they aren't as powerful as most band's primal sonic workouts, but the results are damn impressive for a solo musician." Rolling Stones Alex Foege described the record as a "remarkable yet coolly understated solo debut" and felt that "the album's only disappointment is that despite its home-studio feel, it ultimately reveals little about its creator." New York described both the overall melodies and Grohl's singing as derivative of the grunge sound, but praised the "tight Beatlesesque harmonies" and lyrics that "key into the more poetic moments of dudespeak." Robert Christgau wrote in The Village Voice that the band shows "spirit" but lacks an "identity" and cited the songs "Big Me" and "This Is a Call" as highlights. He later rated the album a three-star honorable mention in his Consumer Guide book, indicating "an enjoyable effort consumers attuned to its overriding aesthetic or individual vision may well treasure".

The album was nominated for Best Alternative Music Album at the 1996 Grammy Awards ceremony, but lost to MTV Unplugged in New York, an album by Grohl's former band Nirvana. Kerrang! named Foo Fighters the best album of the year, and  Rolling Stone put it second on their list, behind PJ Harvey's To Bring You My Love. It also ranked sixth on the Village Voices Pazz & Jop poll, and 20th on Spins list.

Commercial performance
Foo Fighters was a commercial success. In the United States, it debuted on the Billboard 200 at number twenty-three, with first-week sales of 40,000 units. The album debuted at number two in New Zealand's album chart, three in the UK Albums Chart, where it was the highest new entry of the week, and fifth in Australia's ARIA Charts. It also peaked at number five in the Canadian Albums Chart.  By December, it had reached 900,000 units domestically and 2 million worldwide. On September 27, 1995, the album was certified Gold by the Recording Industry Association of America (RIAA), being later certified Platinum on January 26, 1996. By 2011, Foo Fighters had sold 1.468 million units in North America, being the second most successful release of the band behind follow-up The Colour and the Shape. It was also certified Platinum in Canada, and Platinum in the United Kingdom.

Track listing

51:00

The album was reissued in 2003 (on CD) and 2011 (as an LP and for download) with the normal track list.

Personnel
Foo Fighters
Dave Grohl – vocals, guitars, bass guitar, drums, production

Additional musicians
Greg Dulli – additional guitar on "X-Static"
Barrett Jones – backing vocals, production

Technical
Jaq Chartier – jacket artwork
Steve Culp – engineering
Curt Doughty – photography
Tim Gabor – art direction, album design
Stephen Marcussen – mastering
Charles Peterson – photography
Jeff Ross – photography
Tom Rothrock – mixing
Rob Schnapf – mixing
Jennifer Youngblood – cover photo, photography

Charts

Weekly charts

Year-end charts

Certifications

References

External links

1995 debut albums
Capitol Records albums
Foo Fighters albums
Grunge albums
Albums recorded at Robert Lang Studios
Punk rock albums by American artists